Vittorio Emanuele Taparelli d'Azeglio (17 September 1816 - 24 April 1890) was an Italian diplomat and politician born in Turin.

Biography
Taparelli was descended from Piedmontese nobility, the marchesi d'Azeglio (margraves of Azeglio). His father was Roberto d'Azeglio, older brother of statesman Massimo d'Azeglio. He served as a Sardinian diplomat and eventually as minister, including postings to Bavaria, Vienna, The Hague, St Petersburg, London and Paris.

He was a co-founder of the St James's Club in London in 1857. He was an art collector, and was for a time President of the Burlington Fine Arts Club in London.

On his retirement from the diplomatic service in 1871 he was appointed a senator in the 11th Legislature of the Kingdom of Italy.

Honours 
 Knight Grand cross in the Order of Saints Maurice and Lazarus.

References

External links
 Brief biography, from The Correspondence of James McNeill Whistler, University of Glasgow

1816 births
1890 deaths
Diplomats from Turin
Members of the Senate of the Kingdom of Italy
19th-century diplomats